Mark Ginsberg is an American scientist, focusing in molecular structure and function of integrins in immune responses and rheumatology. He currently is the Distinguished Professor at the University of California, San Diego and an Elected Fellow of the American Association for the Advancement of Science.

Education and training

Psychology, McGill University, Montreal, Canada, 1965
Medical Doctor, State University of New York Downstate Medical Center, 1970
Intern/Resident, University of Chicago, 1970-1973
Rheumatology Fellow, University of Chicago, 1973-1975

References

Year of birth missing (living people)
Living people
University of California, San Diego faculty
21st-century American biologists
McGill University Faculty of Science alumni
SUNY Downstate Medical Center alumni
University of Chicago alumni